The 1937 Baylor Bears football team season represented Baylor University in the Southwest Conference (SWC) during the 1937 college football season. In their 12th season under head coach Morley Jennings, the Bears compiled a 7–3 record (3–3 against conference opponents), were ranked No. 4 in the weekly AP Poll after winning their first six games, lost three of their last four games, finished in fourth place in the conference, and outscored opponents by a combined total of 178 to 64. They played their home games at Waco Stadium in Waco, Texas. Carl Brazell was the team captain.

Schedule

References

Baylor
Baylor Bears football seasons
Baylor Bears football